The 81st Separate Airmobile Brigade is a brigade of the Ukrainian Air Assault Forces. The brigade fought in the war in Donbas and in the 2022 Russian invasion of Ukraine.

History 
The 81st Airmobile Brigade was established in fall 2014 from elements of the 25th Airborne Brigade. The brigade includes the 90th and 122nd Separate Airborne Battalions. In May 2015, the volunteer OUN Battalion became part of the brigade. The brigade fought in the Battle of Donetsk Airport. On 9 June 2015, brigade Lieutenant Ivan Zubkov was awarded the title Hero of Ukraine posthumously for calling in artillery fire on himself during the battle at Donetsk Airport. The brigade's 90th Battalion was named for Zubkov on 30 December of that year. 

During the Russian invasion of Ukraine, the Russian Ministry of Defence reported that the brigade was attacked by Russian missile troops during the night of the 24/25 April 2022.

By September 10, the brigade was involved in the Battles of Lyman as part of the larger eastern counteroffensive. On September 24, Russian military bloggers reported that the brigade liberated half of Novoselivka, just 10 km north of Lyman. Four days later on the 28th, the town was fully recaptured alongside members of the National Guard of Ukraine. Following the town's capture, the brigade turned south and east towards Lyman. On October 1, the Russian Ministry of Defence announced the withdrawal from Lyman.

Structure 
As of 2022 the brigade's structure is as follows:

 81st Airmobile Brigade, Kramatorsk
 Headquarters & Headquarters Company
 90th Separate Airmobile Battalion (Created in September 2014 on the basis of 95th AirAssault Brigade and was made up exclusively of volunteers).
 122th Separate Airmobile Battalion (Formed in the fall of 2014 on the basis of 3rd battalion of 80th AirAssault Brigade).
 5th Battalion Tactical Group
 Tank Company
 Reconnaissance Company
 Artillery Group (Brigade artillery group equipped with 2S1 self-propelled artillery vehicles).
 Anti-Aircraft Company
 Support units (This includes all rear elements such as engineers, communication, medics, and material support unit).

References 

Military units and formations established in 2014
Airmobile brigades
Brigades of the Ukrainian Air Assault Forces